This is a list of people who have served as Lord-Lieutenant of Radnorshire. After 1715, all Lord Lieutenants were also Custos Rotulorum of Radnorshire. The office was abolished on 31 March 1974, being replaced by the Lord Lieutenant of Powys, with Deputy Lieutenants for Radnorshire.

Lord Lieutenants of Radnorshire to 1974
see Lord Lieutenant of Wales before 1694
Thomas Herbert, 8th Earl of Pembroke 11 May 1694 – 14 October 1715
Thomas Coningsby, 1st Earl Coningsby 14 October 1715 – 11 September 1721
James Brydges, 1st Duke of Chandos 11 September 1721 – 9 August 1744
vacant
William Perry 9 December 1746 – 13 January 1756
Howell Gwynne 13 January 1756 – 12 July 1766
Edward Harley, 4th Earl of Oxford and Earl Mortimer 12 July 1766 – 11 October 1790
Thomas Harley 8 April 1791 – 12 January 1804
George Rodney, 3rd Baron Rodney 13 September 1804 – 1842
John Walsh, 1st Baron Ormathwaite 22 July 1842 – 21 April 1875
Arthur Walsh, 2nd Baron Ormathwaite 21 April 1875 – 12 September 1895
Sir Powlett Milbank, 2nd Baronet 12 September 1895 – 30 January 1918
Arthur Walsh, 3rd Baron Ormathwaite 5 April 1918 – 20 January 1922
Charles Coltman-Rogers 20 January 1922 – 19 May 1929
Sir Charles Dillwyn-Venables-Llewelyn, 2nd Baronet 20 June 1929 – 10 August 1949 
Sir Michael Dillwyn-Venables-Llewelyn, 3rd Baronet 10 August 1949 – 31 March 1974

References
 

 The Lord-Lieutenants Order 1973 (1973/1754)

1974 disestablishments in Wales
Radnorshire
Radnorshire